Elaine Kao is a Taiwanese-American theatre, television and film actress, best known for her roles in Bridesmaids (2011), Funny People (2009) and Red Doors (2005).

Early life
Kao was raised in the San Fernando Valley. She graduated with a B.A. in economics from the University of California, Irvine and earned her MFA in Acting from CalArts.

Career
Kao has appeared in films such as Bridesmaids (the woman from the couple in Kristen Wiig's jewelry store), as Julie Wong in Georgia Lee's Red Doors (Best Narrative Feature Award in the NY, NY Competition at the Tribeca Film Festival), Funny People, Home Game (as Gail), the J. J. Abrams-penned TV movie pilot The Catch (as Mrs. Yasasui), and the TV movie Supreme Courtships (as the Doctor).

Kao has also appeared in TV shows such as Snowpiercer (as Anne Roche), Kenan (as Elle), Upside-Down Magic (as Professor Han), No Good Nick (as Ms. Lee), For The People (as Alice Huang), American Koko (as series regular Lucky Ling), Netflix's Disjointed (as Mary), Fresh Off the Boat (as Little Auntie), Hawaii Five-0 (as Dr. Jill Loi), Hart of Dixie (as Sharon), The Comeback (as Chinese Producer), Liv and Maddie (as Sensei Rae Dawn), Incredible Crew (as Mom on the episode "Lunch Boxing"), Entourage (as massage parlor madam Maxie), NCIS: LA (as Xue-Li), Cold Case (as Stacy Lee '09), 24, Eleventh Hour, How I Met Your Mother, The Closer (as An-Li Wong), In Gayle We Trust (as Jill), Grey's Anatomy, Close to Home, Curb Your Enthusiasm (as Kevin Nealon's wife, Miyuki), Six Feet Under (as Courtney), Big Day (as Dr. Yang), Girlfriends (as Sarah) and All-American Girl starring Margaret Cho (as Tammy).

Kao also appeared in a number of short films and independent films, as the female protagonist Mai in Kevin Lau's Made in Chinatown, which won Best Short, Best Writing and Best Actor (Tim Chiou) at the 2013 8th Annual NBC Short Cuts Film Festival, with Kao also winning a Best Actress award for her starring role in that film at the 2013 Asians on Film Festival as well. Susie Choi in Christine Yoo's Wedding Palace, as Marianne Quon/Lai Yee ("The Technicolor Movie Queen" of Chinese Cinema) in Timothy Tau's short film bio-pic Keye Luke, as Delia in Cynthia Liu's "Red Thread," as Linda Ahn in Philip Chung's "A Ribbon of Dreams" and as the Mother in James Huang's "Chapter 21."

She has also provided her voice talents to the Hong Kong underworld video game Jet Li: Rise to Honor starring Jet Li and has also produced Kerri Higuchi's film, Mr. Isaac and a comedy short film entitled The Cure for a Diseased Life directed by Ray Chang. Kao has also appeared in commercials from Target, Microsoft, MasterCard, Dell, Capital One, Travelocity and more.

Kao has also appeared in various theatrical productions from the Lodestone Theatre Ensemble (Tennessee Williams' Suddenly, Last Summer, and as Juliet in Romeo and Juliet), East West Players (as Jing-Mei in EWP's production of The Joy Luck Club and as Rose in EWP's production of Philip Kan Gotanda's Sisters Matsumoto), Company of Angels (as Angie in Vasanti Saxena's Sun Sisters), the Center Theater Group and the Mark Taper Forum (as Hae-Joon in BFE at the New Works Festival), The Sacred Fools Theater Company (as Ching in The Caliban)  in Los Angeles, California, as well as South Coast Repertory (in 99 Histories as part of the Pacific Playwrights Festival), the Rude Guerilla Theater (as the Dictator in Howard Barker's Wounds to the Face) The Cleveland Playhouse (as Hannah in Judy Soo Hoo's Solve for X for the Next Stage Festival, opposite Kelvin Han Yee and Roger Fan) and The Met Theater (as Clary, the lead role in Bill's Eye).

Filmography

References

External links

Elaine Kao's Official Website

21st-century American actresses
American film actresses
University of California, Irvine alumni
Year of birth missing (living people)
Living people
American television actresses
American stage actresses
California Institute of the Arts alumni
American people of Chinese descent
American people of Taiwanese descent